Ewa Thalén Finné (born 24 August 1959) is a Swedish Moderate Party politician who served as a First Deputy Speaker of the Riksdag from October 2017 to September 2018. She was Member of the Riksdag from September 2004 to September 2018 and previously from 1998 to 2002.

References

Ewa Thalén Finné at the Riksdag website

Members of the Riksdag from the Moderate Party
Living people
1959 births
Women members of the Riksdag
Members of the Riksdag 2002–2006
21st-century Swedish women politicians